Gabriele Dalla Bernardina (born 11 January 1999) is an Italian footballer who plays as a defender for Serie D club San Martino Speme.

Club career
He made his professional debut in the Coppa Italia for Cittadella on 4 December 2018 against Benevento, coming in as a substitute for Luca Ghiringhelli in the 57th minute.

On 31 January 2019, he joined Olbia on loan.

On 12 July 2019, he moved to Olbia on a permanent basis.

On 1 February 2021, he was loaned to Lucchese.

References

External links
 
 

1999 births
Living people
People from Thiene
Sportspeople from the Province of Vicenza
Association football defenders
Italian footballers
A.S. Cittadella players
A.C. Monza players
Inter Milan players
Olbia Calcio 1905 players
S.S.D. Lucchese 1905 players
Serie C players
Serie D players
Footballers from Veneto